Imbler is a city in Union County, Oregon, United States. The population was 306 at the 2010 census.

History
Imbler was platted in 1891. As Summerville declined, Imbler became the town serving locals in the northern Grande Ronde Valley.

Geography
The state highway connects Imbler with La Grande to the southwest and Elgin to the northeast. Flowing north slightly east of the city is the Grande Ronde River.

Demographics

2010 census
As of the census of 2010, there were 306 people, 114 households, and 90 families residing in the city. The racial makeup of the city was 93.8% White, 1.0% Native American, 1.3% Pacific Islander, 2.6% from other races, and 1.3% from two or more races. Hispanic or Latino of any race were 2.6% of the population.

There were 114 households, of which 36.0% had children under the age of 18 living with them, 69.3% were married couples living together, 7.0% had a female householder with no husband present, 2.6% had a male householder with no wife present, and 21.1% were non-families. 16.7% of all households were made up of individuals, and 8.7% had someone living alone who was 65 years of age or older. The average household size was 2.68 and the average family size was 3.06.

The median age in the city was 43 years. 24.5% of residents were under the age of 18; 6.8% were between the ages of 18 and 24; 24.2% were from 25 to 44; 34.3% were from 45 to 64; and 10.1% were 65 years of age or older. The gender makeup of the city was 50.3% male and 49.7% female.

2000 census
As of the census of 2000, there were 284 people, 106 households, and 83 families residing in the city. The population density was 1,257.3 people per square mile (476.8/km2). There were 111 housing units at an average density of 491.4 per square mile (186.3/km2). The racial makeup of the city was 97.54% White, 0.35% Asian, 0.35% Pacific Islander, 1.41% from other races, and 0.35% from two or more races. Hispanic or Latino of any race were 1.41% of the population.

There were 106 households, out of which 47.2% had children under the age of 18 living with them, 65.1% were married couples living together, 13.2% had a female householder with no husband present, and 20.8% were non-families. 20.8% of all households were made up of individuals, and 10.4% had someone living alone who was 65 years of age or older. The average household size was 2.68 and the average family size was 3.11.

In the city, the population was spread out, with 31.3% under the age of 18, 6.7% from 18 to 24, 26.4% from 25 to 44, 25.4% from 45 to 64, and 10.2% who were 65 years of age or older. The median age was 37 years. For every 100 females, there were 98.6 males. For every 100 females age 18 and over, there were 89.3 males.

The median income for a household in the city was $40,385, and the median income for a family was $42,500. Males had a median income of $38,750 versus $25,938 for females. The per capita income for the city was $18,876. About 2.4% of families and 4.1% of the population were below the poverty line, including 2.3% of those under the age of 18 and 4.4% of those 65 or over.

References

External links
 Entry for Imbler in the Oregon Blue Book

Cities in Oregon
Cities in Union County, Oregon
1891 establishments in Oregon
Populated places established in 1891